Camille Norton (born 1955 ) is an American poet and academic.

Life
She studied with Martha Collins, Linda Dittmar, and Lois Rudnick at the University of Massachusetts Boston; graduated from University of Massachusetts Boston, and Harvard University with a M.A. and Ph.D.

Her work appeared in Greensboro Review, Field: Contemporary Poetry and Poetics, The Colorado Review, Tiferet, Iris, Exphrasis, The White Pelican Review, The Gail Scott Reader, and How2.

She teaches at University of the Pacific.

She will be on the panel for Association of Writers & Writing Programs 2010, "Poets in the World: Building Diverse Communities through Independent Poetry Centers, Blogs, and Radio."

Awards
 2004 National Poetry Series Award Winner
 Best American Poetry 2010 Selection

Works
"Estuary", Caffeine Destiny

Criticism

Editor

References

External links
"Camille Norton Interview", Sacramento Poetry Center, August 01, 2008

"Author's website"

1955 births
Living people
American women poets
Harvard University alumni
University of Massachusetts Boston alumni
Poets from Massachusetts
21st-century American women